The Battle of Cape Palos was the last battle of the Second Barbary War. The battle began when an American squadron under Stephen Decatur attacked and captured an Algerine brig.

Background
After capturing the Algerine flagship Meshuda and sending her to Cartagena under the escort of USS Macedonian, Stephen Decatur and his squadron continued on their way towards Algiers.  On June 19, 1815, they sighted the 22-gun Algerine brig Estedio.

Battle 
Decatur began pursuit of Estedio and chased her into shoal waters near the coast of Spain off Cape Palos. Fearing that his larger vessels might get beached, he sent the smaller vessels in his squadron the USS Epervier, USS Spark, USS Torch, and USS Spitfire to deal with the brig. Here the vessels fought a short engagement lasting a half an hour before the Algerines began to abandon their vessel and surrender. As Estedios crew members began to flee towards the cape in her boats, the American vessels began firing upon the boats, sinking one. The surviving 80 crew of Estedio surrendered. Besides the 80 captured, Estedio lost at least 23 men killed.

Aftermath
After the battle a prize crew took Estedio to Cartagena, where Spanish authorities interned her. They returned her to Algiers at the end of the war, but then on 18 July 1815 the Algerines declared war on Spain so the Spanish government seized both her and the frigate Mashouda, which Decatur had also captured, at Cartagena.

Decatur's squadron regrouped and continued on its way to Algiers to force Dey Omar Agha to terms.

Sources

From Bunker Hill to Manila Bay
The End of Barbary Terror

History of Cartagena, Spain
Cape Palos
Naval battles involving Ottoman Algeria
Conflicts in 1815
1815 in Africa
1815 in the Ottoman Empire
June 1815 events